The Regional Council of Friuli-Venezia Giulia is the legislative assembly of the autonomous region of Friuli-Venezia Giulia.

The assembly was elected for the first time in 1964. Its first location was in Piazza Unità d'Italia; then, in 1972, the seat of the council was moved to Piazza Oberdan.

Composition
Following the amendment of the Statute approved in January 2013 by the Parliament, the assembly is made up of a variable number of councillors, one of every 25,000 inhabitants according to the data of the last census; from the foundation to the 10th regional legislature it was elected a councillor for every 20,000 people. This change led to the election of 49 councillors, including the president, in the 2013 elections, while previously the council was composed of 59 members.

Political groups
The Regional Council of Friuli-Venezia Giulia is currently composed of the following political groups:

See also
Regional council
Politics of Friuli-Venezia Giulia

References

External links
Regional Council of Friuli-Venezia Giulia

Politics of Friuli-Venezia Giulia
Italian Regional Councils
Friuli-Venezia Giulia